Gated reverb or gated ambience is an audio processing technique that combines strong reverb and a noise gate. The effect is often associated with the sound of 1980s British popular music. It was developed in 1979 by producer Steve Lillywhite and engineer Hugh Padgham while working on Peter Gabriel's self-titled third solo album, after Phil Collins played drums without using cymbals at London's Townhouse Studios. The effect is most famously demonstrated in Collins' hit song "In the Air Tonight".

The effect is typically applied to recordings of drums (or live sound reinforcement of drums in a PA system) to make the hits sound powerful and "punchy" while keeping the overall mix clean and transparent sounding. Unlike many reverberation or delay effects, the gated reverb effect does not try to emulate any kind of reverb that occurs in nature. In addition to drums, the effect has occasionally been applied to vocals.

History 
Producer Steve Lillywhite claimed he first experimented the "ambience thing" on drums during the recording of Siouxsie and the Banshees' album The Scream (1978), when drummer Kenny Morris played without using cymbals on several songs. Lillywhite explained to journalist John Robb: "When you listen, you can hear elements of this gated room sound, big compressed room sound that I did on the Banshees." He also listed his production's work on Psychedelic Furs's single "Sister Europe"; this was "all done before the Peter Gabriel album". Lillywhite recognized that the gated reverb drum sound first really showed its head in that form during the recording of the Peter Gabriel 1980 album with engineer Hugh Padgham. 

Lillywhite's and Padgham's work on Peter Gabriel 3 was bookended with their work on XTC's Drums and Wires (1979) and Black Sea (1980). In this period they perfected their technique on Terry Chambers' drums, which can be heard most distinctively on Black Sea (particularly songs "Respectable Street", "Generals and Majors" and "Love At First Sight").

At Townhouse Studios in Shepherd's Bush, west London,  Lillywhite and Padgham famously applied gated reverb to Phil Collins's drum timbre when Collins played without using cymbals on Peter Gabriel's song "Intruder" at Gabriel's request, on Gabriel's eponymous third solo album. Padgham claimed he discovered the sound accidentally when he opened an overhead mic, intended to be used as a talkback channel, above Collins's drum set when the pair were working on the track. The microphone was heavily compressed as well as using a gate.  

Collins then used gated reverb extensively, both in his solo work as well as working with other artists. He used it notably on his hit song "In the Air Tonight", produced by Collins and Padgham. Other examples from Collins' own music also include "Against All Odds (Take a Look at Me Now)", "I Don't Care Anymore", "I Wish It Would Rain Down", and "You'll Be in My Heart" and the Genesis songs "Mama" and "No Son of Mine".

One of the first electronic reverb units to be powered by a microprocessor was the AMS RMX16, which was introduced in 1982, and could replicate otherwise expensive and physically large methods of generating reverb effects.

Gated reverb was used on countless drum tracks during the 1980s, to the point that the sound became a defining characteristic of that decade's popular music.

The British band Duran Duran made repeated use of the recording technique, heard prominently on the drums on the hit single "The Wild Boys", as well as the James Bond theme song "A View To A Kill". Bruce Springsteen used the effect on his hit "Born in the U.S.A.", the drums being played by Max Weinberg. The song "Some Like It Hot" by The Power Station opens with a Tony Thompson drum solo that features the effect prominently. The song "Hounds of Love", produced and released by Kate Bush, makes heavy usage of this method. 

In the 1990s, many bands went back to more natural sounding drums. American rock band Haim used gated reverb on Danielle Haim's drumming for their first album Days Are Gone (2013).By 2018, several contemporary artists began incorporating the effect in some of their rhythm tracks including Lorde and Beyoncé.

Methods of creation

References

Further reading
 
 Effects & Signal Processors article  on Harmony Central includes information on gated reverb.
 Vox (18 August 2017): How a recording studio mishap shaped 80s music

Audio effects
1980s in music